The 1978 Football League Cup Final was the eighteenth League Cup final, and was contested between Liverpool and Nottingham Forest. The initial match resulted in a 0–0 draw at Wembley Stadium on 18 March 1978. The replay was four days later at Old Trafford, and saw John Robertson score from the penalty spot after a professional foul by Phil Thompson on John O'Hare, which TV replays confirmed was just outside the penalty area. This was enough to win the cup for Forest, who thus became the first club to achieve a League and League Cup double.

In the latter game, one of his last for Liverpool, stalwart Ian Callaghan received the only booking of his long career with the club.

Match details

Source for team line-ups:

Replay

Road to Wembley

Nottingham Forest
Forest's route to the final included victories over First Division teams West Ham United, Aston Villa and Leeds United (beating the latter 7–3 on aggregate in the semi-final). They also beat neighbours Notts County.

Liverpool
Liverpool were drawn at home to First Division teams in their first 3 rounds. They defeated Chelsea by 2 goals to nil in round 2, and Derby County by the same scoreline in round 3. They then drew 2-2 at home in round four against Coventry City, before winning the replay 2-0 at Highfield Road. They then beat Third Division Wrexham 3-1 in the quarter-final at The Racecourse Ground, before edging out Arsenal in a two-legged semi-final, which saw Liverpool winning 2-1 at Anfield and drawing 0-0 at Highbury.

References

External links
LFC History Match Report (Replay) 

EFL Cup Finals
League Cup Final 1978
League Cup Final 1978
1977–78 Football League
Football League Cup Final
Football League Cup Final
1970s in Manchester
Sports competitions in Manchester